Beli is a village in the municipality of Kočani, North Macedonia, near the city of Kočani.

Geography and location 
The village is located foothills of the Osogov Mountains, around 2 kilometers northeast of Kočani. The village is reached via Regional Route 1309 which leads to Ponikva. The road that leads into Beli is also the same road that leads to Nivičani, Pantelej, and Rajčani.

History 
It is believed that the village dates from the middle of the 9th century and that it was founded by Slavs who a few decades later accepted Christianity. In the 19th century, Beli was a part of the Kočani Kaza of the Ottoman Empire.

Demographics 
According to the statistician Vasil Kančov, around 400 people lived in Beli around 1900. All were Bulgarians.

According to the secretary of the Bulgarian Exarchate Dimitar Mishev, Beli had 576 Bulgarian residents.

According to the last national census of Macedonia in 2002, the village had 466 residents, all Macedonian.

The table below shows the population in each census year:

References 

Populated places established in the 9th century
Villages in Kočani Municipality